Thomas Vincent Cahill (22 February 1913 – 16 April 1978) was an Australian Roman Catholic bishop.

Early life 
Thomas Vincent Cahill was born on 22 February 1913 in Bendigo, Victoria.

Ordained ministry 
Cahill was ordained a priest on 21 September 1935 at the age of 22 and appointed a priest of the Diocese of Sandhurst in Bendigo. He was consecrated a bishop shortly before his 36th birthday on 9 February 1949 and appointed Bishop of Cairns in Queensland. At the age of 54, he was appointed Archbishop of Goulburn in New South Wales on 13 April 1967.

Later life 
Still serving as archbishop, Cahill died of a heart attack in St Vincent's Hospital in Darlinghurst, Sydney, at the age of 65 on 16 April 1978. He had been admitted to hospital when his health deteriorated during the previous week, having been working hard at his desk until he was taken to hospital.

His funeral was held at St Christopher's Chapel at Manuka in Canberra on 19 April 1978, conducted by the Archbishop of Sydney, James Freeman. After the funeral, Cahill was privately buried in the crypt of St Christopher's Chapel.

References

Further reading 

 

Roman Catholic archbishops of Canberra and Goulburn
1913 births
1978 deaths
People from Bendigo
Roman Catholic bishops of Cairns